Jayasudha Kapoor (born Sujatha Nidudavolu) is an Indian actress and politician known for her works predominantly in Telugu and Tamil cinema. She has also worked in few Kannada, Malayalam, and Hindi films. Known as natural actress, she received five state Nandi Awards for her acting in works such as  Jyothi (1976), Idi Katha Kaadu (1979), Premabhishekam (1981), Meghasandesam (1982), and Dharmaatmudu (1983).

She has garnered five Filmfare Awards South, for her performances in Jyothi (1976), Aame Katha (1977), Gruha Pravesam (1982), Amma Nanna O Tamila Ammayi (2004), and Kotha Bangaru Lokam (2008). In 2008, she received the ANR National Award, and in 2010, she won the Filmfare Lifetime Achievement Award - South for her contributions to Indian cinema. Jayasudha served as Member, Legislative Assembly, from Secunderabad constituency during 2009–2014 in the erstwhile combined Government of Andhra Pradesh.

Early and personal life
Jayasudha was born as Sujatha Nidudavolu in Madras, Tamil Nadu on 17 December 1958 to a Telugu-speaking family of Nidudavolu Rameshwara Rao, and actress Joga Bai known for films such as Balanandam (1954), and Kalahasti Mahatyam (1954). Telugu film actress and director Vijaya Nirmala is the first cousin of her father. Jayasudha's paternal grandfather is eminent scholar and literary historian, Nidudavolu Venkatarao. Her first marriage was to film producer Vadde ramesh's brother-in-law Kakarlapudi Rajendra prasad. However, the marriage ended in divorce. She then married Nitin Kapoor, cousin to actor Jeetendra, in 1985 and they have two children, sons Nihar (born in 1986) and Shreayan (born in 1990).

She was elected as MLA from the Secunderabad constituency in 2009 Andhra Pradesh Assembly elections from Indian National Congress.She later joined the Telugu Desam Party in 2016.Later in 2019 she quit the Telugu Desam Party and joined YSR Congress Party.

Career
Jayasudha made her film debut when she was twelve years old with the Telugu film Pandanti Kapuram (1972). Director K. Balachander gave her a small role in the Tamil film Arangetram where she shared space with Kamal Haasan. She acted in a number of films in Telugu and Tamil mostly under Balachander's direction—Sollathaan Ninaikkiren (1973), Naan Avanillai (1974) and Apoorva Raagangal and in Idi Katha Kaadu with Chiranjeevi. She also changed her name to Jayasudha, since there was already another actress named Sujatha. Her fame quickly spread, where Telugu film producers were offering her good film roles.

While her debut role as heroine in the Telugu film Lakshmana Rekha (1975) got her attention, it was really the title role in Jyothi (remake of the Hindi film Mili starring Jaya Bhaduri) that made her a big star in Telugu films. She was now called a successor to the great Telugu actress Savitri and performed many strong roles and showed excellent range.
She is given the title "Sahaja Nati" which means "natural/realistic actress."

Her roles varied from the cute looking teeny bopper who wore minis in Nomu (1974), to that of a tortured wife of a sadist husband in K. Balachander's film Idi Katha Kaadu (1979) to that of a comedian who discovers that her husband wants to murder her for her wealth in Money (1993). She performed showy roles in Telugu remakes of Hindi films, such as Yugandhar (1979) (the fighter role that Zeenat Aman originated in Don), Illalu (Reena Roy's dark-shaded role from Apnapan (1977)).

In commercial cinema, she received a huge break when she starred in Adavi Ramudu (1977), which broke box office records. She also showed innovativeness and lack of vanity in original Telugu films like Premabhishekam (1981) where she played a supporting role as a deglamorised prostitute, while Sridevi played the female lead.
She has acted in 300 plus feature films in a variety of roles, and in one year, she had 24 film releases.
She has made her unique space in Telugu cinema industry amidst a huge competition between her contemporary actresses Sridevi and Jayaprada. She considers Jayaprada as her closest friend amongst her friends in the industry.

Awards

Filmfare Awards South
 Filmfare Best Actress Award (Telugu) – Jyothi (1976)
 Filmfare Best Actress Award (Telugu) – Aame Katha (1977)
 Filmfare Best Actress Award (Telugu) – Grihapravesam (1982)
 Filmfare Best Supporting Actress Award (Telugu) – Amma Nanna O Tamila Ammayi (2004)
 Filmfare Best Supporting Actress Award (Telugu) – Kotha Bangaru Lokam (2008)
 Filmfare Lifetime Achievement Award - South (2010)

Nandi Awards
 Nandi Award for Best Actress – Jyothi (1976)
 Nandi Award for Best Actress – Idi Katha Kaadu (1979)
 Nandi Award for Best Actress – Premabhishekam (1981)
 Nandi Award for Best Actress – Meghasandesam (1982)
 Nandi Award for Best Actress – Dharmaatmudu (1983)

Other Awards
 Kalasagar Award for Best Actress – Meghasandesam (1982)
 Pride of Indian Cinema Award (2007)
 Andhra Pradesh Cinegoer's Association – Lifetime Achievement Award (2008)
 ANR National Award (2008)

Selected filmography

Telugu

 Pandanti Kapuram (1972)
 Tirapathi (1974)
 Jeevitha Rangam (1974)
 Soggadu (1975)
 Raju Vedale (1976)
 Monagadu (1976)
 Mangalyaniki Maromudi (1976)
 Alludochhadu (1976)
 Jyothi (1976)
 Premalekhalu (1977)
 Gadusu Ammayi (1977)
 Gadasu Pillodu (1977)
 Amaradeepam (1977)
 Adavi Ramudu (1977)
 Aame Katha (1977)
 MallePuvvu (1978)
 Sommokadidhi Sokokadidhi (1978)
 Sivaranjani (1978)
 Lawyer Vishwanath (1978)
 KD No. 1 (1978)
 Katakatala Rudraiah (1978)
 Kalanthakulu (1978)
 Pranam Kareedu (1978)
 Vichitra Jeevitham (1978)
 Yugandhar (1979)
 Shri Tirupati Venkateswara Kalyanam (1979) .... Goddess Lakshmi
 Shivamettina Satyam (1979)
 Muddula Koduku (1979)
 Mande Gundelu (1979)
 Kalyani (1979)
 Judagadu (1979)
 Intinti Ramayanam (1979)
 Driver Ramudu (1979)
 Andamaina Anubhavam (1979)
 Idi Katha Kaadu (1979)
 Sreevari Muchatlu (1980)
 Gopala Rao Gari Ammayi (1980)
 Gopala Krishnudu (1980)
 Gajadonga (1980)
 Edantastulameda (1980)
 Prema Tarangalu (1980)
 Premabhishekam (1981)
 Illalu (1981)
 Agni Poolu (1981)
 Aadavallu Meeku Joharulu (1981)
 Yuvaraju (1982)
 Raga Deepam (1982)
 Nipputho Chelagatam (1982)
 Naa Desam (1982)
 Madhura Swapnam (1982)
 Anuraga Devatha (1982)
 Gruha Pravesam (1982)
 Ramudu Kadu Krishnudu (1983)
 Raj Kumar (1983)
 Poratham (1983)
 Meghasandesam (1983)
 Lanke Bindelu (1983)
 Amayakudu Kadhu Asadhyudu (1983)
 Trisulam (1983)
 Zakhmi Sher (1984)
 Yuddham (1984)
 Jagan (1984)
 Iddaru Dongalu (1984)
 Dandayatra (1984)
 Bobbili Brahmanna (1984)
 Bharyamani (1984)
 Bharatamlo Sankharavam (1984)
 Thirugubatu (1985)
 Palnati Simham (1985)
 Mangalya Balam (1985)
 Maha Sangramam (1985)
 Edadugula Bandham (1985)
 Andarikante Monagadu (1985)
 Tandra Paparayudu (1986)
 Muddula Manavaraalu (1986)
 Dharma Peetam Daddarillindi (1986)
 Aadi Dampathulu (1986)
 Magadheerudu (1986)
 Aatma Bandhuvulu (1987)
 Sardar Dharmanna (1987)
 Kanchana Seeta (1988)
 Bharyabhartala Bandam (1988)
 Raogari Illu (1988)
 Ontari Poratam (1989)
 Naa Mogudu Naake Sontham (1989)
 Vijay (1989)
 Kalikalam
 Doragaariki Donga pellam (Guest Appearance)
 Jeevitha khaidi
 Aasthi mooredu aasa baaredu
 Chillara Mogudu Allari Koduku
 Repati Koduku
 Thodi Kodallu
 Pellala Rajyam
 Aunty
 Money (1993)
 Akka Pettanam Chelleli Kapuram (1993)
 Inspector Jhansi (1993)
 Shrinatha Kavi Sarvabhowma(1993)
 Bangaru Kutumbam(1994)
 Rikshavodu (1995)
 Money Money (1995)
 Deyyam (1996)
 Akka Bagunnava (1996)
 Daddy Daddy (1998)
 Rayalaseema Ramanna Chowdary
 Yuvakudu (2000)
 Kante Koothurne Kanu (2000)
 Chinna (2001)
 Ammaye Navvithe (2001)
 Fools (2003)
 Amma Nanna O Tamila Ammayi (2003)
 Vishnu (2003)
 Balu ABCDEFG (2005)
 Style (2006)
 Bommarillu (2006)
 Photo (2006)
 Vijaya Dasami (2007)
 Parugu (2008)
 Raksha (2008)
 Kalidasu (2008)
 Kotha Bangaru Lokam (2008)
 Kalavaramaye Madilo (2010)
 Solo (2011)
 Daruvu (2012)
 Devudu Chesina Manushulu (2012)
 Adhinayakudu (2012)
 Sarocharu (2012)
 Seethamma Vakitlo Sirimalle Chettu (2013)
 Yevadu (2014)
 Rowdy (2014)
 Govindudu Andarivadele (2014)
 Oopiri (2016)
 Brahmotsavam (2016)
 Ruler (2019)
 Maharshi (2019)
 Kuruvi (2022)

Tamil

 Kula Gouravam (1972)
 Sollathaan Ninaikkiren (1973)
 Petha Manam Pithu (1973)
 Bharatha Vilas (1973)
 Arangetram (1973)
 Baghdad Perazhagi (1973)
 Vellikhizhamai Viratham (1974)
 Prayachittham (1974)
 Dheerga Sumangali (1974)
 Pandhattam (1974) 
 Naan Avanillai (1974)
 Sisubalan (1974)
 Aayirathil Oruthi (1975)
 Apoorva Raagangal (1975)
 Mannavan Vanthaanadi (1975)
 Thangathile Vairam (1975)
 Melnaattu Marumagal (1975)
 Pattikkaattu Raja (1975)
 Maharasi Vazhga (1976)
 Athirshtam Azhaikirathu (1976)
 Vaazhkai Alaigal  (1978)
 Pattakkathi Bhairavan (1979)
 Ninaithale Inikkum (1979)
 Pandiyan (1992)
 Rajadurai (1993)
 Anthimanthaarai (1996)
 Alaipayuthey (2000)
 Thavasi (2001)
 1977 (2009)
 Thozha (2016)
 Chekka Chivantha Vaanam (2018)
 Varisu (2023)

Malayalam
 Rasaleela (1975)
 Thiruvonam (1975)
 Romeo (1976)
 Mohiniyattam (1976)
 Shivathandavam (1977)
 Sivaranjani (1978)
 Priyadarshini (1978)
 Jeevikkan Padikkanam (1981)
 Sarovaram (1993)
 Ishtam (2001)

Hindi
 Aaina (1977) 
 Shabhash Daddy (1979)
 Sooryavansham (1999) (as Jaya Kapoor)

Kannada
Nee Thanda Kanike (1985)
Thayiya Madilu (2007)
Vajrakaya (2015)

As producer
 Kanchana Sita (1987)
 Kalikalam (1990)
 Mera Pati Sirf Mera Hai (1990)
 Adrustam (1992)
 Vinta Kodallu (1993)
 Hands Up (1999)

References

External links
 

Living people
Telugu people
Indian film actresses
Telugu actresses
1958 births
Politicians from Hyderabad, India
Indian former Hindus
Indian actor-politicians
Actresses in Tamil cinema
Actresses in Kannada cinema
Actresses in Hindi cinema
Actresses in Malayalam cinema
Filmfare Awards South winners
Nandi Award winners
Converts to Christianity from Hinduism
Indian National Congress politicians from Andhra Pradesh
Members of the Andhra Pradesh Legislative Assembly
Indian child actresses
Actresses from Chennai
People from Secunderabad